Total Divas was an American reality television series that premiered on July 28, 2013, on E!. The series gave viewers an inside look of the lives of WWE Divas from their work within WWE to their personal lives. Behind the scene footage of the Divas is also included.

Production

WWE announcer Josh Mathews revealed on November 20, 2013, that Total Divas had been renewed for a second season. Season 2 premiered on March 16, 2014, with Summer Rae joining the cast. Unlike other WWE programs, most of the performers use their real names instead of their ring names, leading to Cameron, Naomi, Natalya, Jimmy Uso, and Tyson Kidd being referred to as Ariane, Trinity, Nattie, Jon, and TJ respectively.

Cast

Main cast
 Brie Bella (Brianna Danielson)
 Cameron (Ariane Andrew)
 Eva Marie (Natalie Marie Coyle)
 Naomi (Trinity Fatu)
 Natalya (Natalie Neidhart-Wilson)
 Nikki Bella (Stephanie Garcia-Colace)
 Summer Rae (Danielle Moinet)

Recurring cast
 Daniel Bryan (Brie's husband)
 Vincent Isayan (Cameron's boyfriend)
 Jonathan Coyle (Eva Marie's husband)
 Jimmy Uso (Naomi's husband)
 Tyson Kidd (Natalya's husband)
 John Cena (Nikki's fiancé)
 Mark Carrano (WWE Senior Director of Talent Relations)
 Sandra Gray (WWE's seamstress)

Guest stars
 Alicia Fox (Victoria Crawford)
 Dolph Ziggler (Nicholas "Nick" Nemeth)
 Rosa Mendes (Milena Roucka)
 Tamina Snuka (Sarona Snuka-Polamalu)
 Kathy Colace (Brie & Nikki's mother)
 J.J. Garcia (Brie & Nikki's brother)

Episodes
Notes

 "New Diva On The Block" was renamed "Without John" when it was added to the WWE Network.

Ratings

References

External links

 
 

2014 American television seasons
Total Divas